Claude Barrett (5 December 1907 – 3 August 1976) was an English footballer who played in the Football League for Bradford Park Avenue, Port Vale and York City.

Career
Born in Rawdon, West Yorkshire, Barrett played for Rawdon Old Boys and turned professional with Bradford Park Avenue in February 1932, where he made 47 Second Division appearances in the Football League. He joined Port Vale of the Third Division North in June 1936 and after making his debut in a 1–0 defeat at Wrexham on 19 September 1936, he made nineteen consecutive appearances, only losing his place through influenza in January 1937. However, upon recovery he discovered that Roderick Welsh had effectively filled his place and so Barrett left for York City on a free transfer in April 1937. He made his debut in a 2–1 defeat to Crewe Alexandra on 6 November 1937 and he finished the 1937–38 season with 38 appearances in all competitions. He lost his place in the York team following a 6–0 defeat to Bradford City on 10 December 1938, and was released at the end of the 1938–39 season.

Career statistics
Source:

References

1907 births
1976 deaths
Footballers from Leeds
English footballers
Association football defenders
Bradford (Park Avenue) A.F.C. players
Port Vale F.C. players
York City F.C. players
English Football League players